Tourism in Panama represents one of Panama‘s main activities. The main areas of tourism in the country focus on business tourism, beaches, health and trade. Most of the tourists come from the United States, Canada, Europe, Central America, and South America. Tourism generates profits of approximately US$1,400 million annually.
This figure has increased rapidly since the millionth tourist arrived in 2004. There were 2 million tourists in 2011.

About 1.5 million tourists entered Panama in 2013 via the airport of Tocumen. In Panama a tourist, on average, spends US$365–385per day, the highest per capita tourist spending in Central America, while the average tourist in Panama stays for between 6 and 7 days.

In 2011, Panama was visited by more than 2 million tourists, an increase of 18% compared to 2010. The New York Times Magazine placed Panama as the best place to visit in 2012 as the country's economy was working well, with Panama having regained the control of the Canal 12 years previously. For the daily the hallmark of the country is the inter-oceanic way and its extension, which must end in 2014, with an investment of billions of dollars.

The Waldorf Astoria Panama, the first Waldorf Astoria hotel in Latin America, opened in March 2013. Trump Ocean Club, opened in 2010 and is now JW Marriott Panama. The BioMuseo, a center of natural history, opened in October 2014. The old part of the city, Panamá Viejo, has been a UNESCO World Heritage Site since 1997. The archipelago of Bocas del Toro, is popular with backpackers.

See also
 Economy of Panama

References

External links

 
Panama